Tooth and Claw is a phrase from Alfred, Lord Tennyson's poem In Memoriam A.H.H.  It could refer to:
 Tooth and Claw (Doctor Who), a television episode
 Tooth and Claw (short story collection), by T.C. Boyle
 Tooth and Claw (novel), by Jo Walton
 "Tooth and Claw", a song by Animals as Leaders off the album The Joy of Motion